Diaan Lawrenson (born 4 April 1978) is a South African actress, producer and lecturer. She is best known for her roles in the films and series Raaiselkind, Semi-Soet and 7de Laan. She is the Dean of AFDA, The School for the Creative Economy.

Personal life
She was born 4 April 1978 in Vanderbijlpark, South Africa. During her elementary school, she acted in the school stage and joined the musical choir as well. In 2001, Diaan graduated from African Film Drama and Art School (AFDA) in Johannesburg.

She is married to fellow actor Jody Abrahams in 2014 at the St. Martin's-in-the-Veld Anglican Church in Rosebank, Johannesburg. The couple have one girl: Olivia-Rose and boy: Thomas James.

Career
In 2002, she made a minor television role of "Merle" in the series Egoli: Place of Gold. Then she acted in the 2003 series Song vir Katryn with another minor role. In the same year, she received a supportive role in the serial Backstage. In that, she got the opportunity to make her film debut with the film Stander.

In 2008, she joined the cast of SABC 2 soap opera, 7de Laan and played the role "Paula van der Leque". Her role received huge popularity, where she continued to play the role for 8 years until retired in 2016. In both 2010 and 2013, she won the YOU Spectacular Award for Best Actress for this role. Then in 2009, she won the ATKV Feather award for the Best Actress. In 2012, she played the role "" in the film Semi-Soet directed by Joshua Rous. Since 2016, she started to work as a lecturer at  AFDA in Cape Town and in 2019, she was appointed as the dean of the campus. Meanwhile, she is the co-owner of the media production company, "Jester Productions".

In 2015, she wrote and produced the short film Hartloop. In the meantime, she acted in the critics acclaim film Mooirivier and played the role of "Sarah". In the same year, she appeared in the film Sink directed by AFDA alumnus Brett Michael Inne. The film won several awards at many film festivals and also received critics acclaim. In 2016, she acted in the film Tablemanners with the role "Megan". Then in 2017, she acted in the film Raaiselkind and then Susters in 2018, both became blockbusters. In 2021, she joined the kykNET anthology series Spoorloos for its third installment Steynhof as Joey Steyn.

Filmography

Theatre works
 Kysbriewe (2014)
 Bullets over Bishop Lavis (2012 – 2014)
 Roemers en Bloemers (2012 – 2013)
 Vrydag is Skeidag (2010 – 2011)
 Under the fig tree (2009)
 Dirk & Lindie (2008)
 Die Vals Snor (2007)
 Pleiboyz (2006)
 So Waar As Vet (2005)
 Dubbel en Dwars (2004)
 Four Play (2003 – 2004)
 Six Inches (2002 – 2003)
 Pendoring Eiendoms Beperk (2002)
 Closer (2001)
 Go It Maid! (2001)
 Magspel (2000)
 Dangerous Liasons (2000)
 Theresa Se Droom (2000)
 Who Digs Who (2000)
 Rudely Stamped (1999 – 2000)
 Requiem (1998)

Awards
 AFDA Nomination: Best Actress, Best Supporting Actress, Best Writer
 SAFTA nomination: Best Actress
 Crystal nomination: Best Actress, Best Newcomer
 YOU Spectacular Award: Best Actress (2013)
 YOU Spectacular Award: Best Actress (2010)
 ATKV Feather: Best Actress (2009)
 AFDA Award: Best Actress, Best Supporting Actress, Best Writer (1998 - 2001)

References

External links
 IMDb

Living people
21st-century South African actresses
South African film actresses
1978 births